Karmein Chan was a 13-year-old Chinese-Australian girl who was abducted from her home in Templestowe, Victoria, during the night of 13 April 1991 and was subsequently murdered. "Mr Cruel", a serial child rapist active in the Melbourne area at the time of the murder, is considered the prime suspect.

Kidnapping
Karmein Chan was at home babysitting her two younger sisters while both her parents worked at a Chinese restaurant they owned in the nearby Melbourne suburb of Eltham. The girls were confronted by a man in a balaclava with a knife, who forced Chan's sisters into a wardrobe before fleeing with Chan. Before leaving, the offender spray-painted "Asian drug deal", "payback" and "more to come" on a vehicle in the Chans' front yard. Police suspect this was a ruse to distract them from the killer's real motive. Chan's mother made an emotional plea on television for her daughter's return.

Investigation
Prior to Chan's abduction, there had been several kidnappings and sexual assaults of girls in Melbourne's suburbs by an offender known in the media as Mr Cruel. The Victoria Police had started scaling down Operation Challenge, which had been established in response to the crimes attributed to Mr Cruel, the day before Chan's abduction. Detectives believed that Chan would be released the same as previous girls who had been abducted.

On 6 May 1991, 23 days after Chan's abduction, Victoria Police formed the Spectrum Taskforce to investigate Chan's abduction and to continue Operation Challenge investigations. A reward of $100,000 was offered for information on her abduction.

On 9 April 1992, Chan's remains were found in a landfill area at Edgars Creek in the suburb of Thomastown. The skull had three bullet holes in the back of the head. The body had probably been there for twelve months. On 31 January 1994, the Spectrum Taskforce was disbanded. The offender was never brought to justice. A few detectives had doubts whether Chan was a Mr Cruel victim. An inquest was held in 1997 with the coroner finding that she met her death through foul play, but it was not possible to identify the person or people responsible. 

The case has remained open with cold case detectives regularly reviewing the investigation. On the 25th anniversary of her abduction the reward was increased from $100,000 to $1 million.

See also
List of kidnappings
List of solved missing person cases: pre-2000
Lists of unsolved murders

References

Further reading
  
  

1990s missing person cases
1991 murders in Australia
Deaths by firearm in Victoria (Australia)
Deaths by person in Australia
Incidents of violence against girls
Missing person cases in Australia
Murder in Victoria (Australia)
Unsolved murders in Australia